Simon Oakes may refer to:
 Simon Oakes (executive), CEO and president of Hammer Films
 Simon Oakes (cricketer), English cricketer